Anne Carey is President of Production at Archer Gray, a media production, finance, and venture investment company based in New York City. In her career as an independent producer, Carey has been associated with filmmakers such as Ang Lee, Anton Corbijn, Bill Condon, Todd Field, Greg Mottola, Tamara Jenkins, Alan Ball, Mike Mills and Nicole Holofcener.  Carey’s films have been distributed by Fox Searchlight Pictures, Sony Pictures Classics, Warner Independent Pictures, Focus Features, Miramax and HBO; and her films have played and premiered at major domestic and international film festivals including the Sundance Film Festival, the Berlin International Film Festival and the Toronto International Film Festival.

Filmography
She was producer for all films unless otherwise noted.

Film

Thanks

Television

External links

https://web.archive.org/web/20140819103017/http://www.archergray.com/about-anne-carey.html

Living people
Year of birth missing (living people)
American film producers